Heath Francis Young (born 21 September 1978 in Sydney) is an Australian judoka, who competed in the men's half-lightweight category. He held five Australian titles in his own division, picked up a total of thirteen medals in his career, including two golds from the Oceania Championships, and represented his nation Australia in the 66-kg class at the 2004 Summer Olympics. Throughout his sporting career, Young trained full-time for the senior team at Tiger-Do Judo Academy in his native Sydney, under his personal coach, father, and sensei Terry Young.

Young qualified for the Australian squad in the men's half-lightweight class (66 kg) at the 2004 Summer Olympics in Athens, by topping the field of judoka and receiving a berth from the Oceania Championships in Noumea, New Caledonia. He opened his match with a more satisfying victory over Bolivia's Juan José Paz by points on waza-ari, before losing out in an earth-shattering ippon defeat with a stunning shoulder throw to Cuban judoka and eventual bronze medalist Yordanis Arencibia. In the repechage, Young gave himself a chance for an Olympic bronze medal, but crashed out in the first round of the draft, as Venezuela's Ludwig Ortíz tightly pinned him on the tatami with a kuzure kami shiho gatame (broken upper four-quarter hold-down) at one minute and ten seconds.

References

External links

Australian Olympic Team Bio

1978 births
Living people
Australian male judoka
Olympic judoka of Australia
Judoka at the 2004 Summer Olympics
Sportspeople from Sydney